Caryocolum nearcticum is a moth of the family Gelechiidae. It is found in the United States, from California to Washington.

The length of the forewings is 5–5.5 mm. The forewings are dark grey-brown regularly mottled with light scales. There are no distinct markings. Adults have been recorded on wing from late July to early September.

References

Moths described in 1988
nearcticum
Moths of North America